Attaway is a surname. Notable people with the surname include:

Mary Attaway Lee (1923–1989), American playwright and theatre director
Murray Attaway, American musician
Ruth Attaway (1910–1987), American film and stage actress
William Attaway (1911–1986), African-American novelist, short story writer, essayist, songwriter, playwright and screenwrite

See also
Attaway v. Omega,  was a decision by the Indiana Court of Appeal

References